Sweatman is an unincorporated community in Montgomery County, Mississippi, United States.

Notes

Unincorporated communities in Montgomery County, Mississippi
Unincorporated communities in Mississippi